

Events
 186,000 BC -	Earliest footprints of humans found in South Africa
 100,000 BC - Khoikhoi people with cattle and those without living together for thousands of years Khoikhoi (agri-pastoralists)
 8000 BC - Date of man-made shelters discovered north of current day Johannesburg

References
See Years in South Africa

History of Africa
History of South Africa by period